The Nanjing Institute of Technology (NJIT;) is an undergraduate university in Nanjing, Jiangsu province, China. It was founded in 2000 under the approval of the Ministry of Education, merged from two different engineering colleges majoring in electrical engineering and mechanical engineering each. The school was directly affiliated to China's Ministry of Electric Power, and has prestigious reputation in electrical engineering professional field of China.

NIT offers a wide range of undergraduate, graduate, and doctoral programs in various fields, including engineering, science, management, and arts. It also offers several English-taught programs, and the university has a growing number of international students from different countries.

External links

2000 establishments in China
Educational institutions established in 2000
Technical universities and colleges in China
Universities and colleges in Nanjing